Benita Parri (until 1937 Fink, 1937–1943 Virgla; 2 February 1922 – 21 May 2008) was an Estonian figure skating and tennis coach and former ice dancer.

She was born in Viljandi.

In 1936 she joined with Frieda Rosenberg's gymnastics and dance group. In 1951 he won silver medal at Estonian championships in ice dance.

1950–1965 he worked as a figure skating and tennis coach at Viljandi Sport Club. Students: Anne Ronk, Malle Aarik, Mait Murss.

References

1922 births
2008 deaths
Estonian female ice dancers
Estonian sports coaches
Sportspeople from Viljandi